Hazaribag College of Dental Sciences and Hospital (HCDSH) is a private dental college located in Hazaribag, in the Indian state of Jharkhand. It is affiliated with the Vinoba Bhave University and is recognized by Dental Council of India. It offers Bachelor of Dental Science (BDS) and Master of Dental Science (MDS) courses.

References

Dental colleges in India
Colleges affiliated to Vinoba Bhave University
Universities and colleges in Jharkhand